Abagrotis erratica is a moth of the family Noctuidae first described by Smith in 1890. It is found in North America from southern British Columbia including Vancouver Island south to central Utah and central California. It is also found in extreme southern Alberta.

The wingspan is 35–38 mm. Adults are on wing in August in Alberta. There is one generation per year.

References

External links

erratica
Moths of North America
Moths described in 1890